Cleveland State Vikings men's basketball is the men's college basketball team that represents Cleveland State University. Prior to rebranding from Fenn College, they were known as the Fenn College Foxes. Cleveland State has been in Division I since 1972. They are a member of the Horizon League (1994–present) Cleveland State was formerly in the Mid-Continent Conference (1982–1994). Prior to 1982, Cleveland State was an independent program.

History

The 1985–86 season is arguably the most memorable in Vikings history, as they achieved the improbable in becoming the first ever 14th seeded team to make it to the Sweet Sixteen of the  1986 NCAA tournament. Coach Kevin Mackey's squad, led by Ken 'Mouse' McFadden and Eric Mudd, upset Bobby Knight's 3rd seeded Indiana Hoosiers, by a final of 83-79. Following a 75-69 second round win against 6th seeded St.Joseph's, the Vikings would ultimately lose to Navy 71-70 on a clutch basket in the waning seconds by future Hall of Famer, David Robinson. Cleveland State would qualify for the NIT Tournament the following two seasons, but went 23 seasons until returning to the NCAA Tournament.

On Monday, December 15, 2008, Cleveland State had their biggest regular season victory in school history, upsetting the #11 Syracuse Orange, 72-69, on a last-second, three-quarter court shot from senior guard Cedric Jackson. It was CSU's third-ever win over a Top 25 ranked opponent, and first ever on the road. They would pick up their fourth and fifth wins over Top 25 opponents later that same season when they won at #17 Butler in the championship game of the Horizon League Tournament 57-54, and then in the first round of the 2009 NCAA tournament when, as the 13th seeded team in the Midwest bracket, they routed 4th seeded and #12 Wake Forest by a final score of 84-69.

Records

Record versus Horizon League
Records vs. Horizon League schools as of the end of the 2020–2021 school year.

Record versus Ohio schools
Records vs. Ohio schools as of the end of the 2015–2016 school year.

Individual career records

Cleveland State wins vs. the AP Top 25

Awards

AMCU/Mid Continent Player of the Year

 Ken McFadden – 1988

AMCU/Mid Continent Coach of the Year

 Kevin Mackey - 1985, 1986
 Mike Boyd - 1993

AMCU/Mid Continent Newcomer of the Year

 Clinton Smith - 1985 
 Sam Mitchell, 1993

Horizon League Player of the Year

 Norris Cole - 2011

Horizon League Newcomer of the Year

 Damon Stringer - 2000
 Bryn Forbes - 2013

Horizon League Defensive Player of the Year

 Cedric Jackson - 2009
 Norris Cole - 2011
 Tre Gomillion - 2021
 D'Moi Hodge - 2022

Horizon League Sixth Man of the Year

 Jon Harris - 2014

Horizon League Coach of the Year

 Gary Waters - 2008
 Dennis Gates - 2020, 2021

HoopDirt.com Division I Coach of the Year

 Dennis Gates - 2021

Attendance

Year-by-year

Largest Crowds

Wolstein Center

Woodling Gym

Public Auditorium

NBA draft history
8 total NBA draft picks.

Regular Draft

Record by year

Conference tournaments

AMCU

1988, No tournament held
1989, Ineligible for tournament
1990, Ineligible for tournament

Horizon League

1996, Did not qualify as 9th overall in the conference.

2019, Did not qualify as 9th overall in the conference.

Postseason history

NCAA Division I Tournament history 
Cleveland State has made three appearances in the NCAA Division I men's basketball tournament, having a record of 3–3.

NIT results
Cleveland State has appeared in the National Invitation Tournament six times, with the Vikings having a record of 3–6.

CBI results
The Vikings have received one College Basketball Invitational (CBI) berth. Their record is 0–1.

CIT results
Cleveland State has appeared in the CollegeInsider.com Postseason Tournament twice, having a combined record of 1–2.

Retired numbers

Cleveland State has retired four numbers in program history.

Head Coaching History

Championships
Cleveland State has won six regular season championships (1985, 1986, 1993, 2011, 2021, 2022) and three conference tournaments (1986, 2009, 2021).

{| border="0" style="width:100%;"
|-
| valign="top" |

Alumni in the National Basketball Association

Seven Cleveland State alumni have played in the NBA, including:

Norris Cole
Franklin Edwards 
Bryn Forbes
Cedric Jackson 
Jim Les
Clinton Smith 
Darren Tillis

Media
The flagship station for CSU men's basketball is WARF 1350 AM, with announcer Al Pawlowski.  Any CSU games WARF can't air due to conflicts slide over to sister station WTAM 1100 AM/106.9 FM.

References

External links

 

 
Basketball teams established in 1929